Ali Zogheyr (also Romanized as ‘Alī Zogheyr) is a village in Ahudasht Rural District, Shavur District, Shush County, Khuzestan Province, Iran. At the 2006 census, its population was 385, in 49 families.

References 

Populated places in Shush County